Kathryn A. Gardner (born October 9, 1956) is a Judge of the Kansas Court of Appeals

Education and legal career

Gardner earned her Bachelor of Arts in English from Geneva College and taught high school English before attending law school. She received her Juris Doctor from the University of Kansas School of Law in 1983. She began her legal career in 1983 as a research attorney for Kansas Court of Appeals Judge Joe Haley Swinehart. She then served as an assistant attorney general before relocating to Wichita where served as chambers law clerk to United States District Court for the District of Kansas Judge Sam A. Crow. In 1988, she joined the law firm of Martin, Pringle as an associate and left as a partner in 2000. When Gardner returned to Topeka that year, she again served as chambers law clerk to Judge Crow.

Appointment to Kansas  Court of Appeals

Gardner was appointed to the Court of Appeals by Governor Sam Brownback on January 29, 2015 and her nomination was confirmed on March 11, 2015. She was appointed to the seat vacated by Caleb Stegall who was elevated to the Kansas Supreme Court.

Gardner was required to stand for retention by voters in 2016 in order to remain on the bench. She was retained for a four-year term that began in January 2017 and expires on January 10, 2021.

Personal

Gardner was born in Sterling, Kansas in 1956. She and her husband, Timothy, have been married for over 36 years and have three grown daughters and two granddaughters.

See also 

 2020 Kansas elections

References

External links
Official Biography on Kansas Judicial Branch website

Living people
1956 births
20th-century American lawyers
21st-century American judges
Geneva College alumni
Kansas Court of Appeals Judges
Kansas lawyers
People from Sterling, Kansas
University of Kansas School of Law alumni
20th-century American women lawyers
21st-century American women judges